The Movie Orgy is a 1968 film directed by Joe Dante and produced by Jon Davison. It was an evolving compilation of film clips, commercials, and film trailers, initially assembled by Dante when he was an undergraduate at the Philadelphia College of Art. At its longest, it ran for seven and a half hours and could be considered the analog prelude to the mash-up videos and supercut edits now prevalent on digital platforms like YouTube and Vimeo.

Summary
The film stands as a simultaneous celebration and campy tweaking of mid-20th century Americana, culling liberally from the B-movie cinema of Dante and Davison's youth (including brief clips from The Phantom Planet and Teenagers from Outer Space), early TV commercials, newsreel footage of early A-bomb tests, cartoons, westerns, sci-fi, bloopers and war movies as well as clips from children's TV shows its college-age audiences had forgotten they had seen. Perhaps most memorable among these is the excerpted moment from Andy's Gang of a puppeteer-controlled cat and mouse performing “Jesus Loves Me".

Elements of several features are revisited throughout the movie as recurrent, serialized comic motifs. Among these serialized movies in the longer-form version were College Confidential, Speed Crazy, Earth vs. the Flying Saucers, I Was a Teenage Werewolf, Attack of the 50 Foot Woman, Beginning of the End, The Giant Gila Monster and The Amazing Colossal Man that were rotated in and out. Bizarre non-sequitur elements are featured in between the recurrent narrative vignettes, including strange advertisements (including one for Carter's Little Liver Pills) and educational films. The film was designed to be a free-flowing, communal audience experience. Interactivity (e.g. sing-alongs to showcased television show theme songs) was encouraged.

Among the numerous celebrities featured were Rod Serling, Alfred Hitchcock, The Beatles, Ann-Margret, Ngo Dinh Diem, Groucho Marx, President Dwight D. Eisenhower, President Richard M. Nixon, The Animals, Dean Martin, and comedians Abbott and Costello.

The Movie Orgy comprises clips of copyrighted materials, and thus the film can only be shown for free when it plays museums and cinemas around the world. Joe Dante retains a copy.

Production
The film, assembled without permission of the clips' owners, toured colleges and repertory cinemas with support from Schlitz beer.

See also
 List of American films of 1968
 List of longest films
 A Movie – the legendary 1958 collage film by experimental filmmaker Bruce Connor, which is similar in structure
 Golden Age of Television (1950s-1960s)
 Americana
 Meme
 Mystery Science Theater 3000 - a cult show which featured some of the aforementioned films

References

External links
 
 
 
 Excerpt (presented by Trailers from Hell)
 "'It’s just one abomination after another': A Preservation History of Joe Dante’s	The Movie Orgy

1968 films
Films directed by Joe Dante
American student films
Compilation films
Collage film
Fan films
American anthology films
1960s rediscovered films
Rediscovered American films
Collage television
1960s English-language films